Lampronia is a genus of moths of the family Prodoxidae.

Diversity
The genus has a Holarctic distribution and contains about twenty-five described species. There are additional undescribed species in North America, Japan and Iran.

Description
Adults are medium-sized and have a golden or dark ground color, although some are unicolored. The forewings usually have white or yellowish spots.

Biology
Most species are day-flying.

Lampronia corticella and Lampronia capitella are minor pests on raspberry (Rubus idaeus) and current (Ribes species).

Species

Subgenus Lampronia
 Lampronia aeneella
 Lampronia aeripennella
 Lampronia altaica
 Lampronia argillella
 Lampronia capitella
 Lampronia corticella
 Lampronia flavimitrella
 Lampronia fuscatella
 Lampronia intermediella
 Lampronia luzella
 Lampronia morosa
 Lampronia novempunctata
 Lampronia oregonella
 Lampronia provectella (syn: Lampronia triangulifera)
 Lampronia psychidella
 Lampronia pubicornis
 Lampronia quinquepunctata
 Lampronia redimitella
 Lampronia rupella
 Lampronia russatella
 Lampronia sakhalinella
 Lampronia splendidella
 Lampronia standfussiella
 Lampronia stangei
 Lampronia taylorella
Subgenus Tanysaccus Davis, 1978
 Lampronia aenescens
 Lampronia humilis
 Lampronia sublustris

References
 Lampronia at tolweb

Prodoxidae
Adeloidea genera
Taxa named by James Francis Stephens